Nesh (also: Nïsh, Naish) is a village and the center of Nesh District, Kandahar Province, Afghanistan.

See also
Kandahar Province

Populated places in Kandahar Province